A phosphetane is a 4-membered organophosphorus heterocycle. The parent phosphetane molecule, which has the formula C3H7P, is one atom larger than phosphiranes, one smaller than phospholes, and is the heavy-atom analogue of azetidines. The first known phosphetane synthesis was reported in 1957 by Kosolapoff and Struck, but the method was both inefficient and hard to reproduce, with yields rarely exceeding 1%. A far more efficient method was reported in 1962 by McBride, whose method allowed for the first studies into the physical and chemical properties of phosphetanes. Phosphetanes are a well understood class of molecules that have found broad applications as chemical building blocks, reagents for organic/inorganic synthesis, and ligands in coordination chemistry.

Synthesis 
Many methods towards the synthesis of phosphetanes have been developed since 1957. The following are the most utilized.

McBride method (Electrophilic addition to olefins) 
The method initially outlined by McBride has been developed for singular alkenes, as well as dienes. Both types follow the same general mechanism: formation of a phosphenium cation from a dichlorophosphine and aluminum trichloride, electrophilic addition by an alkene to the phosphenium, carbocation rearrangement, intramolecular nucleophilic addition of the new alkyl phosphine to the carbocation, and oxidation of the resulting phosphetanium with water to obtain a phosphetane oxide. Limitations of this approach are unpredictable carbocation rearrangement in more complexly branched alkanes, the incompatibility of carbocations with many nucleophilic functional groups, and the risk of cation quenching by elimination pathways.

Mono-ene addition 
In the case of electrophilic addition by a single alkene, carbocation rearrangement occurs via hydride or alkyl shifts. The general scheme for phosphetane synthesis from mono-enes is given below:

Diene addition 
In the case of electrophilic addition by a diene, carbocation rearrangement first occurs via cation-π cyclization. The general scheme for phosphetane synthesis from dienes is given below:

Alkylation and intramolecular cyclization 
Alkylation and cyclization pathways have been developed for both phosphines and phosphine oxides.

From phosphines 
The synthesis of phosphetanes from P(III) alkylation and subsequent cyclization usually proceeds through sequential phosphanide/phosphine displacement of 1,3-alkyl dihalides or sulfonate esters (OTf, OTs, OMs, etc.). The phosphanide source is commonly the lithium salt, but can also be accessed by in situ deprotonation of phosphines. The SN2 mechanism associated with this transformation comes with the advantage of stereospecificity, but at the expense of electrophilic or epimerizable functional group tolerance and kinetically slow reactivity with secondary/tertiary leaving groups. The general mechanism is seen below:

From phosphine oxides 
Similar syntheses from P(V) compounds are known but are far rarer due to their relative inefficiency and unpredictability. This preparation features the in situ formation of a Grignard reagent, followed by intramolecular addition/cyclization to a phosphine oxide, all on an n-propyl backbone. This was the method employed by Kosolapoff and Struck in the first synthesis of a phosphetane. The general mechanism is seen below:

Cyclopropane ring-expansion 
Another way to make phosphetanes comes from the ring-expansion of cyclopropanes, in which it seems a phosphine is directly inserted into a C-C bond. The true mechanism of this transformation is similar to that of the McBride synthesis and is sometimes classified as such, with similar advantages and drawbacks. Although relieving the cyclopropane ring strain is of great assistance in the initial C-P bond, exhaustive alkyl substitution to stabilize the formed carbocation is often required. The general mechanism is seen below:

[2+2] cycloaddition 
One final method that has been observed to produce phosphetanes is the [2+2] cycloaddition of phosphaalkenes and olefins. This method is not often discussed for its tendency to produce phosphetanes, but rather for its insight into the reactivity of the much more elusive phosphaalkenes. The difficult synthesis of these phosphaalkenes severely limits the utility of the method as it relates to phosphetane synthesis, despite its attractive stereospecific and modular approach. This usually involves a Lewis acid bound phosphorus, and can occur with electron rich phosphaalkenes and electron poor olefins, or the inverse. An example of each, and the mechanism, are seen below:

Structure and bonding 
Experimental and crystallographic data exists for many of the phosphetane types listed below, however, all of the geometric and electronic (HOMO and LUMO) information below was determined theoretically with the B3LYP functional and DEF2-SVP basis set using ORCA (5.0.3) for the parent molecule at each coordination number to provide a general and consistent trend as an introduction to the subject. Geometries and orbital plots were generated using Avogadro (4.1).

Dicoordinate phosphetanes 
Though rarely reported in the literature, if at all, dicoordinate phosphetanes of phosphenium, phosphanide, and phosphorus radical archetypes are theoretically possible as transient reactive intermediates. Their optimized physical and electronic geometries are presented mainly as a means of comparison to the more commonly observed tri, tetra, and pentacoordinate phosphetanes.

Phosphenium ion 
The phosphenium case is isoelectronic to a cyclic carbene. The optimized geometry is quite planar in comparison to the other dicoordinate cases, with its HOMO and LUMO being the exocyclic lone pair and empty p-orbital, respectively.

Phosphorus radical 
The optimized geometry and frontier molecular orbitals for the dicoordinate phosphorus radical are similar to the phosphenium case. The ring is slightly less planar, and the HOMO is now a singly occupied p-orbital. The lone pair is the HOMO-1.

Phosphanide ion 
The phosphanide case is isoelectronic to cyclic ethers. In this ion, there is significantly more pucker within the phosphetane ring, along with widening of the C-P-C angle, but the HOMO and HOMO-1 are similar to the radical case, now both being doubly occupied.

Tricoordinate phosphetanes 
Tricoordinate phosphetanes are well known in the literature and exemplify the classical trigonal pyramidal P(III) phosphorus center. Conformational isomerism is introduced in these tricoordinate molecules, albeit with a very low kinetic barrier (~2.45 kcal/mol for the given example), in which the hydrogen can be pseudo-axial (as shown), or pseudo-equatorial. The pseudo-axial conformer is the more stable of the two. Since the lone pair is larger, it settles in the pseudo-equatorial position, but this is inverted rather swiftly due to minimization of steric clash as R becomes bigger than H. The phosphetane ring is puckered, not planar, due to the asymmetry above and below the ring about phosphorus. As is expected, the HOMO is the nucleophilic lone pair usually associated with phosphines.

Tetracoordinate phosphetanes 
Tetracoordinate phosphetanes are by far the most commonly observed geometry around the phosphorus center, usually as the ubiquitous P(V) phosphorus oxide center, but not uncommonly as phosphetanium ions.

Phosphetanium ion 
The phosphetanium is isoelectronic to a tetracoordinate carbon and assumes its tetrahedral geometry, greatly planarizing the ring by increasing molecular symmetry. Deviation from this would occur with any change of one of the hydrogen atoms with a bulkier group, after which, the ring would pucker, with the larger substituent pseudo-equatorial. The acidity of the α-carbon hydrogens is significantly increased due to the charge neutralization driving force; this is reflected in the C-H σ-antibonding contributions to the LUMO.

Phosphetane oxide 
The other classic phosphorus compound is the tetrahedral P(V) phosphine oxide. Like tricoordinate phosphetanes, phosphetane oxides also exhibit isomerism, this time with a much larger kinetic barrier. When the oxide is pseudo-equatorial (as shown), the designation is trans, while when the oxide is pseudo-axial, the compound is cis. The preference for one over the other is largely based on the middle carbon substitution, rather than the oxide. As one may expect of a covalently bound oxide, the HOMO is an oxygen lone pair and the LUMO is largely contributed to by the P-O π-antibonding interaction.

Pentacoordinate phosphetanes 
Pentacoordinate phosphetanes, or phosphoranes, present an alternative geometric mantle on which a P(V) phosphorus center may exist. It is important to note that this class of phosphoranes are typically not trigonal bipyramidal, but closer to square pyramidal. A result of this geometric perturbation is the emergence of a P-H σ-antibonding that is represented prominently in the LUMO, accounting for the characteristic Lewis acidity of square pyramidal phosphoranes.

Hexacoordinate phosphetanes 
Hexacoordinate, anionic phosphates are mainly known in the literature as counterions (hexafluorophosphate), but are theoretically possible as reactive intermediates for associative mechanisms at phosphorus centers. In this compound, phosphorus assumes the expected octahedral geometry. As expected for this hexacoordinate phosphate, C-H σ-bonding orbitals comprise the HOMO, accounting for the expected hydricity due to favorable charge neutralization. Similar to the dicoordinate case, these optimized physical and electronic geometries are presented mainly as a means of comparison to the more commonly observed tri, tetra, and pentacoordinate phosphetanes.

Reactivity 
Phoshetanes display a broad range of reactivity and appear in the literature in many different facets of a chemical reaction. There are cases where phosphetanes themselves are the substrate of interest, cases where phosphetanes are observed as transient intermediates during a chemical reaction, cases where phosphetanes are used as the active reagents in chemical reactions, and cases where phosphetanes are ligated to a metal that is the active reagent in a given process. All of these overarching scenarios are discussed in more detail below.

Inherent reactivity 
Much of the reactivity inherent to, or performed directly on, phosphetane substrates is an ode to its ring strain, calculated to be ~17.9 kcal/mol. The release of some or all of this strain energy drive the two characteristic types of reactivity observed: ring expansion and ring opening. Reactivity at the phosphorus center, including reduction, oxidation, and phosphorane formation as well as alkylation of ring carbons can be performed without cleavage of the ring in some instances, representing the final types of inherent reactivity. These four will be discussed in more detail below.

Ring opening reactions 
Phosphetane ring opening reactions have been of synthetic interest in the past as a potential method for the creation of polypropylphosphine polymers and materials, but despite ring opening reactions occurring, the polymerization of such material has only been sparsely observed in very concentrated solutions.

The main observation of ring opening is as a byproduct of other intended reactions, such as phosphetanium oxidation and α-carbon functionalization.

One intentional and constructive method of ring-opening has been outlined in the literature and features a phosphetane ylide that undergoes Wittig reactivity with aldehydes to form γ-unsaturated phosphine oxides.

Ring expansion reactions 
Methods of ring expansion to insert carbon, oxygen, and nitrogen atoms into phosphetane rings to produce the corresponding phospholes exist but are of limited synthetic utility due to their unpredictable stereo and regioselectivity on unsymmetric phosphetanes. Insertion of carbon typically involves the addition of water to a phosphetanium featuring a leaving group or pi-system (usually enones but also phenyl groups) alpha to phosphorus that is liberated by alkyl migration after collapse of the phosphetane oxide.

Insertion of oxygen into the P-C bond of a phosphetane oxide is done with mCPBA and proceeds via a currently unknown mechanism with unusually high regioselectivity for the less substituted carbon.

Nitrogen atom insertion proceeds from photolysis of an azidophosphetane oxide, presumably from a Curtius type rearrangement from the generated nitrene. Though this is the proposed mechanism, there are clear doubts about the N=P=O intermediate.

Reactivity at phosphorus 
Redox between P(III) phosphetanes and P(V) phosphetane oxides are possible and well documented through the use of mild reagents such as oxygen or water and silicon hydrides to achieve oxidation and reduction, respectively.

More interesting is the synthesis of stable 5-coordinate phosphetanes (phosphoranes) from both traditional P(III) phosphines and P(V) phosphine oxides, in addition to P(V) phosphetanium ions, via a couple general methods. With respect to phosphine substrates, phosphorane synthesis usually occurs via reaction with peroxides/disulfides or perfluoro π-systems, such as perfluoro acetone, for which the mechanism is unresolved, or perfluoro 1,3-butadiene.

Methods to access phosphoranes from P(V) oxides and phosphetaniums are usually through stepwise deoxygenation-nucleophilic addition pathways, or direct addition pathways, respectively. Nucleophiles are usually halides or alkoxy functional groups, and in the case of deoxygenation-substitution, the two nucleophiles can be either tethered (e.g. catechol) or not.

α-Carbon functionalization 
The final portion of inherent reactivity of phosphetanes to be discussed is the functionalization of the phosphetane oxide alpha carbons, almost always through deprotonation with organolithium reagents, followed by SN2 displacement of an alkyl halide. The use of chiral axillaries on phosphorus can make this process stereoselective.

Reactive intermediates 
The appearance of phosphetanes and derivatives thereof is well documented in organic chemistry literature as reactive intermediates for a myriad of different processes. These processes include, but are not limited to, Wittig, Horner-Wadsworth-Emmons, Corey-Fuchs, and Seyferth-Gilbert chemistries. All of these processes include the in-situ formation and decomposition of oxaphosphetane intermediates through metathesis-type pathways to form alkenes or alkynes from aldehydes and a phosphorus reagent.

Reagents and catalysts 
Since the early 2010s, much progress has been made in the development of phosphetanes as useful reagents and catalysts to complement transition metal catalysts in organic synthesis. These efforts have primarily been made by the research group of Dr. Alexander Radosevich at Pennsylvania State University, and subsequently the Massachusetts Institute of Technology, but contributions from the lab of Dr. Thomas Werner at the Leibniz-Institut für Katalyse (Leibniz Institute for Catalysis) have also been impactful. The common theme underpinning these works is an active phosphetane species reductively acting on a substrate, resulting in formation of phosphetane oxide and the desired product, followed by reduction of the phosphetane oxide back to the phosphetane with a mild silicon hydride which closes the catalytic cycle.

The uncharacteristic biphilic nature of these phosphines, and other non-trigonal pnictogen compounds, is a result of molecular symmetry perturbation, in this case, imposed by the ring strain inherent to phospetanes. Most of these transformations are probed based on stoichiometric reactivity of the phosphetane, illustrating their utility as catalysts or reagents in the event there is substrate incompatibility with the hydride. Below is the general catalytic cycle and an abbreviated list of reactions that can be catalyzed through this method.

Ligands for transition metal complexes 
Transition metal complexes with ligated P(III) phosphetanes are known for tungsten, iron, molybdenum, platinum, ruthenium, rhodium, palladium, iridium, and possibly more, to produce achiral, racemic, and optically pure coordination complexes. Despite these efforts, the intricate details about their nature as ligands and effects on metal centers as it deviates from traditional phosphines is relatively understudied. Direct comparison of classic bis-trialkylphosphinedichloroplatinum(II) complexes with the corresponding phosphetane containing complex possibly enumerate a weakened σ-trans effect and π-accepting character of the phosphetane ligand, most likely due to the aforementioned symmetry distortion, corroborated by short Pt-P (2.208 and 2.210 angstrom) and Pt-Cl (2.342 and 2.355 angstrom) bonds. More work is needed to make this claim categorically.

Most of the study and interest in phosphetanes as ligands is there ability to impart enantioselectivity on certain catalytic hydrogenation, reduction, and π-allyl reactions when using the corresponding chiral phosphetanes. As is the case for most asymmetric catalysis, disfavored steric interaction between chiral ligands, substrate, and other reagents are credited for the observed enantio or diastereoselectivity, though it seems the use of more traditional chiral phosphines has proved more popular than that of chiral phosphetanes. Below are select examples of enantioselective catalysis using phosphetane ligands.

References

Phosphorus heterocycles
Four-membered rings